Amsel is a surname. Notable people with the surname include:

Beth Amsel, singer-songwriter
Robert Amsel (born 1946), gay rights activist
Richard Amsel (1947-1985), American illustrator and graphic designer
 Lena Amsel (1898-1928), was a dancer and actress.
Fictional characters:
General Heinrich Amsel, Nazi general and antagonist in Call of Duty: World at War

See also
Juraj Amšel, water polo player

German-language surnames
Surnames from nicknames